Behind the Iron Curtain refers to being east of the Cold War European boundary known as the Iron Curtain.

Behind the Iron Curtain could also refer to:

 Behind the Iron Curtain (video), a video by Iron Maiden
 Behind the Iron Curtain (album), a live album by Nico

See also
Iron Curtain (disambiguation)